Don Shula Stadium is a multi-purpose stadium located on the campus of John Carroll University in University Heights, Ohio, near Cleveland.  Don Shula Stadium is home to the Division III Blue Streaks of John Carroll University and has an official capacity of 5,416 spectators.  It also serves as a home for many of the school's varsity, club and intramural athletic programs.  The facility is named for Pro Football Hall of Fame coach and former NFL player, Don Shula.  Shula was a cornerback for the Blue Streaks in the late 1940s and was drafted in the ninth round of the 1951 NFL Draft.

History and renovation
Don Shula Stadium was built around the preexisting Wasmer Field.  Wasmer Field has been the "home turf" for the JCU Blue Streaks since 1968.  Don Shula Stadium was opened in 2003 with the official dedication and opening event held on September 27 of that year in a football game between the John Carroll Blue Streaks and the Polar Bears of Ohio Northern University.

The stadium was named in honor of Don Shula, an alumnus of John Carroll University and a retired Pro Football Hall of Fame coach in the National Football League.  Shula was the defensive coordinator for the Detroit Lions for the 1960-62 seasons.  He was also the head coach for both the Baltimore Colts (1963-1969) and the Miami Dolphins (1970-1995).  In his 32 seasons as a head coach, Shula won fourteen Division titles, five AFC Championships, two Super Bowls (VII, VIII) and the 1968 NFL Championship.  He holds several NFL records including the record for most NFL regular season wins (328) and the Miami Dolphins' record for most career wins (257).

The completion of Don Shula Stadium added new locker rooms and coaches' offices to the complex.  It also replaced the old weight room with a new, state-of-the-art version and added an updated training room.  A new press box and coaches booths were also added.

References

External links
 Don Shula Stadium at Wasmer Field

College football venues
Multi-purpose stadiums in the United States
John Carroll Blue Streaks football
Cleveland SC
American football venues in Ohio
Buildings and structures in Cuyahoga County, Ohio
Soccer venues in Ohio
Sports venues completed in 2003
2003 establishments in Ohio
Defunct National Premier Soccer League stadiums